Paderno Dugnano railway station is a railway station in Italy. It serves the town of Paderno Dugnano and is located on Via IV Novembre.

Services
Paderno Dugnano is served by lines S2 and S4 of the Milan suburban railway network, operated by the Lombard railway company Trenord.

See also
 Milan suburban railway network

References

External links

 Ferrovienord official site - Paderno Dugnano railway station 

Railway stations in Lombardy
Ferrovienord stations
Railway stations opened in 1879
Milan S Lines stations